For Those Who Think Young, appearing on the album cover as (for those who think young) and originally to be entitled for those who think jung, is the third album by Canadian new wave band Rough Trade; it was released in 1981 (True North TN-48 in Canada; Boardwalk NB-33261-1, US; Big Time, UK; CBS 85385, The Netherlands). It climbed to #9 in Canada on the RPM Top 50 Albums Chart on November 7, 1981 (putting it at #1 on the CANCON Chart listing), and held the position for three weeks, dropping out of the Top 50 after sixteen weeks on February 6 of the following year. It was certified gold in Canada by the CRIA on November 1, 1981. The single "All Touch" gave the band its biggest commercial success, reaching #12 in Canada on the RPM Top 50 Singles Chart (#2 on the CANCON Chart) and #58 on the U.S. Billboard Hot 100.

Singles released from the album included "All Touch" (b/w "Baptism of Fire") [True North TN4-165], "Blood Lust" (b/w "Bodies In Collision") [True North TN4-170], "For Those Who Think Young" (b/w "Attitude") [True North TN4-171], all 1981 Canadian releases in picture sleeves, and the 1982 U.S. release of "All Touch" (b/w "The Sacred And The Profane") [Boardwalk NB-11-167-7].

Track listing

Personnel

 Carole Pope – Songwriter, lead vocals
 Kevan Staples – Vocals, guitar, piano, synthesiser, producer
 David McMorrow – Vocals, piano, Rhodes, synthesisers
 Terry Wilkins – Vocals, Fender fretless bass
 Bucky Berger – Vocals, drums
 Gene Martynec – Producer
 Gary Gray – Engineer
 Rick Starks – Assistant engineer
 Jack Skinner – Mastering
 Peter J. Moore – Remastering, restoration
 Dusty Springfield – Backing vocals
 Shawne Jackson – Backing vocals
 Colina Phillips – Backing vocals
 Derek Taylor – Make-up

Charts

Singles

References

External links
 Amazon.com review
 Artist Direct review
 Rate Your Music review

1981 albums
Rough Trade (band) albums